Cynicocrates is a genus of moth in the family Lecithoceridae. It contains the species Cynicocrates tachytoma, which is found in Taiwan.

References

Natural History Museum Lepidoptera genus database

Lecithoceridae
Monotypic moth genera